Isaac Preston Cory (1802–1842) was a British antiquarian who compiled ancient fragments and published them in a compendium called Cory's Ancient Fragments (1826, revised 1832).

Career
Cory was a Fellow of Caius College, having obtained a master's degree in law in 1827. He soon after became a professional barrister, but also was an antiquarian and book collector. He was a personal friend of Thomas Taylor and through him obtained ancient fragments from classical neoplatonists which he added to his compendium of ancient fragments.

He died in Blundeston in 1842.

Works
Cory's Ancient Fragments (1826; revised 1832)
Metaphysical inquiry into method, objects, and result of ancient and modern philosophy  (1833) 
Chronological inquiry into the ancient history of Egypt (1837) 
Mythological inquiry into the recondite theology of the heathens (1837) 
A practical treatise on accounts, exhibiting a view of the discrepancies between the practice of the law and of merchants (1939)

References

19th-century antiquarians
English antiquarians
1842 deaths
1802 births